Frýdek may refer to:

Frýdek-Místek, a city in the Moravian-Silesian Region of the Czech Republic
Frýdek, Frýdek-Místek, a town in Silesia that joined the Moravian town of Místek
Christián Frýdek (born 1999), Czech footballer
Martin Frýdek (born 1969), Czech footballer
Martin Frýdek (footballer, born 1992), Czech footballer

See also
Frydek